= Michael Eineder =

German electrical engineer

Michael Eineder is an electrical engineer at the Technical University of Munich (TUM), Germany. He was named a Fellow of the Institute of Electrical and Electronics Engineers (IEEE) in 2016 for his contributions to synthetic aperture radar image processing for geodesy.
